Ixylasia semivitreata is a moth of the subfamily Arctiinae. It was described by George Hampson in 1905. It is found in the Brazilian states of Rio de Janeiro and Santa Catarina.

References

 

Arctiinae
Moths described in 1905